Gustaf Palm (c. 1760 – 1807) was a Swedish supercargo for the Swedish East India Company in Guangzhou. He was the son of Asmund Palm.

Biography 
Gustaf Palm was born in the Ottoman Empire to Asmund Palm, a diplomat and merchant of the Swedish Levant Company, and his wife Eva van Bruyn. He was brother of artists Elisabeth and Mimica Palm.

Palm was enrolled as supercargo for the Swedish East India Company. He was the last enlisted person holding that position in Guangzhou.

References 

Year of birth unknown
1760 births
Age of Liberty people
18th-century Swedish businesspeople
Swedish East India Company people
Swedish people of German descent
Swedish people of Dutch descent

People from Constantinople
1807 deaths